Jair is a ward no.1 of Sarkegad Gaupalika Humla District in the Karnali Zone of north-western part Nepal. At the time of the 1991 Nepal census it had a population of 1336 persons living in 270 individual households.

References

External links
UN map of the municipalities of Dolpa District

Populated places in Humla District